Potamogeton illinoensis, commonly known as Illinois pondweed  or shining pondweed, is an aquatic plant. It provides food and cover for aquatic animals.

It is generally not weedy in its native range, but it is a troublesome noxious weed in Viedma, Río Negro, Argentina, where it is an introduced species.

References

illinoensis
Freshwater plants
Flora of Illinois
Flora without expected TNC conservation status